Martinikerk Rondeau is a 110-minute documentary film directed by Will Fraser and produced by Fugue State Films for Boeijenga Music Publications, about the historic organs of the Dutch province of Groningen. Centred on the organ of the Martinikerk, Groningen, it also includes the organs of Krewerd, Zeerijp, Loppersum, Noordwolde, Kantens, Uithuizen, Noordbroek, Nieuw-Scheemda, Der Aa-kerk, Groningen, Leens, Zandeweer, Zuidbroek, Farmsum, and Middelstum. The film includes interviews with organ builder Jürgen Ahrend, organ consultant Cor Edskes and organ builder Bernhardt Edskes. It was released as part of the boxed set Pronkjuwelen in Stad en Ommeland in 2009.

External links

Information about Martinikerk Rondeau

British documentary films
Dutch documentary films
2009 films
2009 documentary films
2000s Dutch-language films
Documentary films about musical instruments
2000s British films